Martha Nelson may refer to:
 Martha Nelson-Grant, Canadian Olympic swimmer
 Martha Nelson Thomas, American sculptor